Michael Lee Patterson (born January 26, 1958) is a former Major League Baseball outfielder. He batted left and threw right-handed.

He was signed by the Athletics as an amateur free agent in 1975. He was traded along with Dave Revering and minor-league left-handed pitcher Chuck Dougherty from the Athletics to the Yankees for Jim Spencer and Tom Underwood on May 20, .

References

External links
, or Retrosheet, or Pura Pelota

1958 births
Living people
African-American baseball players
American expatriate baseball players in Japan
Baseball players from Santa Monica, California
Boise A's players
Columbus Clippers players
Jersey City A's players
Major League Baseball outfielders
Modesto A's players
New York Yankees players
Nippon Ham Fighters players
Oakland Athletics players
Ogden A's players
Tigres de Aragua players
American expatriate baseball players in Venezuela
Waterbury A's players
West Haven Whitecaps players
21st-century African-American people
20th-century African-American sportspeople
Susan Miller Dorsey High School alumni